Xingtian Temple (also Xingtian Gong or Hsing Tian Kong) is a popular temple in Zhongshan District, Taipei, Taiwan. This temple is devoted to Lord Guan, the Patron Deity of businessmen, military personnel and policeman. This temple is situated on a street corner near the center of the city. Sculptures of dragons feature prominently in this temple's design. It covers over 7,000 square meters.

History
It was constructed in 1967. In 2014, in an effort to reduce particle air pollution, the temple became the first in Taiwan to ban the burning of incense.

Transportation
The temple and its surrounding is served by Xingtian Temple Station of Taipei Metro.

See also
 Taoism & Three teachings
 Bangka Lungshan Temple, Wanhua District
 Bangka Qingshui Temple, Wanhua District
 Ciyou Temple, Songshan District
 Dalongdong Baoan Temple, Datong District
 Guandu Temple, Beitou District
 Zhinan Temple, Muzha District
 List of temples in Taiwan

References 

1967 establishments in Taiwan
Guandi temples
Religious buildings and structures completed in 1967
Taoist temples in Taipei